The Espigão Alto State Forest Park is a state park in the state of Rio Grande do Sul, Brazil.
It protects an area of old forest of which araucarias are the most prominent species.

Location

The Espigão Alto State Park is in the Espigão district of the municipality of Barracão, Rio Grande do Sul.
The park is in the Araucarias Plateau, in the region of Campos de Cima da Serra, in the northeast of the state.
The park is in the Brazilian Highlands, near the Uruguay River in the valley of the Marmeleiro stream.

History

The Espigão Alto Forest Reserve was created by state decree 658 of 10 March 1949.
It was transformed into a state park by law 2.440 of 2 October 1954.
Law 8.893 of 2 August 1989 allowed for the cultivation of exotic forest species that already existed in this and other state forest parks.
The park was registered as being part of the state's natural and cultural heritage on 23 July 1994.
Decree 42.000 of 9 December 2002 declared the land covered by the park as being of public utility for the purpose of expropriation as a step towards regularizing land ownership in the park.
As of 2013 the park was open only to researchers and to students receiving environmental education.

Environment

The park preserves a large remnant of Araucaria forest (mixed rainforest) and smaller remnants of the Upper Uruguay Forest (seasonal deciduous forest).
Some of the plants in the park are centuries old.
The most conspicuous trees are the araucarias, which once covered 25% of the state but have been reduced to 1%.

The forest is a refuge for wild animals such as pacas, robust capuchin monkeys, pygmy brocket (Mazama nana) and ocelot (Leopardus pardalis), as well as species of birds such as the vinaceous-breasted amazon (Amazona vinacea), red-spectacled amazon (Amazona pretrei), scarlet ibis (Eudocimus ruber) and azure jay (Cyanocorax caeruleus).

Notes

Sources

State parks of Brazil
Protected areas established in 1949
1949 establishments in Brazil
Protected areas of Rio Grande do Sul